Nikolija Jovanović (born on 19 October 1989) is a Serbian singer and rapper. Born in Zagreb and raised in Belgrade, she is the daughter of singer Vesna Zmijanac. Nikolija initially gained prominence by appearing on the reality television show Survivor Srbija VIP: Philippines (2010). 

In 2013, she pursued a music career with her breakthrough single "Ćao zdravo". Nikolija has so far released three studio albums: №1 (2016), Yin & Yang (2019) and Aurora (2022), as well as numerous standalone singles. She has been nominated for several MAC Awards, winning the 2023 Female Trap Song of the Year with "Pilot".

Since 2014, Jovanović has been in a relationship with musician and actor Relja Popović, with whom she has two daughters.

Early life
Jovanović was born on 19 October 1989 in Zagreb. She is the only child of singer Vesna Zmijanac and economist Vlada Jovanović, who operated as the chief of marketing at PGP RTS. Her parents divorced shortly after she had been born and Jovanović has two step-siblings from her father's second marriage. Nikolija spent her childhood in Belgrade. In 1995, she appeared in her mother's music video for the song "Kad bih znala kako si". According to Zmijanac, Nikolija showed interest and talent for music from an early age. However, Jovanović also stated that as a child she did not desire to become a singer due to her experience of having a famous singer mother.

For her senior year of high school, Nikolija moved to Athens, Greece. There she subsequently began attending The School of Business & Economics at the American Deree College, where in 2013 she graduated with a degree in international business.

Career

2010-2016: Career beginnings and No1
Jovanović made her first public appearance in 2010 by competing alongside her mother on the reality TV series Survivor Srbija VIP: Philippines, where she was the first contestant to be voted out. Nikolija subsequently voluntarily left the show on medical grounds. Her music career began during her studies in Athens where she started performing in local nightclubs as a dancer and MC, claiming to have worked next to acts such as Tiësto, Armin van Buuren, Paul van Dyk and Swedish House Mafia. At the beginning of 2011, she released her first song "Crazy 2 Night" featuring DJ Kas under the stage name "Nicole", but failed to make a significant success.

After graduating from college, Nikolija relocated back to Serbia where she was introduced by singer Milan Stanković to prominent songwriters and producers Nebojša Arežina and Marko Perunučić, who would become her frequent collaborators. She came on to the Serbian music scene with the single "Ćao zdravo" featuring Serbian rapper Teča, released in April 2013 under IDJTunes. The single received polarizing public reception due to its provocative lyrics and S&M-inspired music video. During the summer of 2013, she rose to further prominence after she had been featured on the song "Milion dolara" by Ana Nikolić, which also served as the title track for her fourth album. In November, Nikolija released a self-titled rap song.

In March 2014, Nikolija was announced as a contestant of the Serbian spin-off of Dancing with the Stars, where she finished in 8th place after six weeks of competing. In August 2014, she collaborated with Serbian pop-rap duo Elitni odredi on "Alkohola litar". The single went on to become Nikolija's highest-performing music video to date, having amassed over seventy million views as of December 2021. She also had a solo release, titled "Kako posle mene", in October 2014. With these two singles Nikolija drew wider popularity by embracing singing rather than just rapping, as well as by crossing over to more commercial pop-folk sound, which she mixed with urban music influences, creating a style of music that would become signature for her.

"Opasna igra" was released in June the following year to commercial success as well. Its music video was declared the most viewed Serbian video on YouTube in 2015. In October, she released her first balladic single, called "Ljubavni maneken". Nikolija made her runway debut for George Styler at Belgrade Fashion Week in November the same year. On 20 October 2016, she released her debut album №1 under City Records, featuring previously released singles and three new songs: "101 Propušteni poziv", "Plavo more" and "Pucaj zbog nas". It was sold in 50,000 copies.

2017-2022: Yin & Yang and Aurora
In March 2017, Nikolija released "Promeni mi planove". In July, it was followed by the single "Loš momak" produced by Coby. Single's accompanied music video has collected over 47 million views. Same month, it was revealed that Nikolija would star as a post-apocalyptic warrior alongside Žarko Laušević and Sergej Trifunović in a Mad Max-inspired movie, titled Volja sinovljeva, directed by Nemanja Ćeranić. In October 2017, she released "Moj tempo". During the following year, Jovanović released three singles in succession; "Malo", "Nema limita" and "Slažem". Music video for "Nema limita", which was directed by Ćeranić and inspired by Volja Sinovljeva, has amassed over 45 million views.

Her second studio album Yin & Yang was released under IDJTunes on 24 April 2019. It was preceded by two official singles: the title track and "Nije lako biti ja" featuring Serbian rapper Fox and it also included three standalone releases: "Loš momak", "Nema limita" and "Slažem" as bonus tracks on the physical edition. A month after the album's release, it was announced that Nikolija and Relja Popović would release a duet called "Meduza" as a part of Relja's first solo project. With over seven million streams, their collaboration is currently Nikolija's most successful release on Spotify. In July 2019, she promoted her album at the Ulaz music festival in Belgrade. In September, Jovanović released "Sija grad".

In February 2020, Nikolija released "Stav Milionera", which would become her last official single under IDJTunes. She was subsequently signed to the newly established record label Made In BLKN founded by Relja Popović in distribution deal with IDJTunes. Under new label she released a series of four singles during 2020: "Nakit", "No Plaky", "O bivšima" and "High Life". In December that year, Jovanović and her half-sister launched a fashion brand, called About Me, with streetwear designed by her. In the following year, she had two solo releases: "Sve bih" and "Divlja orhideja", while in October 2021, Nikolija and Teya Dora released "Ulice" from the soundtrack for the Serbian thriller Južni Vetar 2: Ubrzanje. 

In June 2022, Nikolija appeared on Devito's single "Ljubav". In August, she held a concert during the Music Week Festival in Belgrade. Her third studio album Aurora was announced for late 2022. Released digitally on 4 December through Made In BLKN, it included seven tracks that had been released individually. The lead single "Gringo" was released in April. The album's title track featuring Bosnian singer Amna peaked at number 24 on Billboards Croatia Songs chart.

2023-present
On 26 January 2023, Nikolija performed during the Music Awards Ceremony at the Belgrade Arena. The performance included the chorus from her forthcoming single "Prezime", which was written by Rasta.

Personal life
In 2011, Nikolija started a relationship with Greek NBA player Thanasis Antetokounmpo. In September 2014, it was reported that the two were no longer together.

In late 2014, she began dating Serbian actor, musician and at the time member of Elitni Odredi, Relja Popović, after they had collaborated on the single "Alkohola litar". Her relationship with Relja was also rumored to be the reason for the breakup of Elitni Odredi in early 2015, which has since been denied by both members of the group. Nikolija stated in 2022 that she had been a victim of cyberbullying due to the allegations. On 26 September 2016, Nikolija gave birth to daughter Rea. Popović and her welcomed their second daughter on 17 July 2021, whose named has not been officially confirmed. 

Nikolija and her family reside in Belgrade's downtown municipality Vračar. She also maintains residency in Athens.

Discography

 №1 (2016)
 Yin & Yang (2019)
 Aurora (2022)

Filmography

Awards and nominations

References

External links

 
 

Living people
1989 births
Singers from Belgrade
21st-century Serbian women singers
Serbian rappers
Serbian pop singers
Serbian folk-pop singers
Fashion designers from Belgrade
Musicians from Zagreb
Serbs of Croatia